German concentration camps may refer to different camps which were operated by German states:
Concentration camps during the Herero and Namaqua genocide
Shark Island concentration camp
Cottbus-Sielow concentration camp in Cottbus interning Jewish immigrants in interwar Germany
Stargard concentration camp in Stargard, interning Jewish immigrants in interwar Germany
Nazi concentration camp system, operated by Nazi Germany from 1933 to 1945
Other types of Nazi camps, operated by Nazi Germany from 1933 to 1945
Extermination camps
Forced-labor camps
Polenlager
Transit camps (Nazi Germany), such as Drancy transit camp